Raúl Torres (born 24 April 1984 in Spain) is a Spanish footballer.

References

Living people
1984 births
Association football midfielders
Association football forwards
Spanish footballers
Burgos CF footballers
Terrassa FC footballers
UE Figueres footballers
Kitchee SC players
UD Lanzarote players
Cultural Leonesa footballers
CF Badalona players
CE L'Hospitalet players
EC Granollers players
UE Vilassar de Mar players